Marco Antonio Bustos (born April 22, 1996) is a Canadian professional soccer player who plays as an attacking midfielder for Allsvenskan club Värnamo.

Club career

Youth
He began playing soccer at age four with the Garden City CC. Bustos played for FC Northwest in his native Winnipeg for four years before joining the Vancouver Whitecaps's academy in 2011. Bustos played from the U-16 level up, and completed his time at the academy with a 19-goal performance during the 2013-14 USSDA season. He also played seven games for the Vancouver U-23 PDL side, scoring four goals.

Vancouver Whitecaps
Bustos made his professional debut for Vancouver in the 2014 Canadian Championship, starting a game against Toronto FC on May 7, 2014. On September 15, it was announced Bustos had signed a pre-contract with Vancouver and would officially be added to the team's roster in January 2015. Bustos made his MLS league debut for the Whitecaps against FC Dallas on October 14, 2015.

After the 2017 season, Bustos would re-sign an 18-month contract with the Whitecaps, with club options for the 2019, 2020 and 2021 seasons. He would also be loaned to Zacatepec of Ascenso MX for the duration of the 18-month contract. In August 2018, Bustos and Whitecaps FC mutually agreed to terminate his MLS contract.

OKC Energy
In August 2018, Bustos joined the United Soccer League's OKC Energy FC.

Valour FC
On May 7, 2019, Bustos signed for his hometown club, Canadian Premier League side Valour FC.

Pacific FC
On January 30, 2020, Bustos signed with Pacific FC. He made his debut on August 15 against the HFX Wanderers, netting a goal in a 2–2 draw. In his final match of 2020, Bustos scored twice and assisted twice in the first half to finish the season with five goals and three assists. Bustos continued with Pacific for the 2021 Canadian Premier League, and on July 10 he scored two goals against York United FC, making him the Canadian Premier League's all time leading goalscorer, with 15 goals in three years between Valour and Pacific.

After the conclusion of the 2022 season, Bustos joined Major League Soccer side Toronto FC on trial. In January 2023, Pacific announced Bustos would be departing the club, following the expiration of his contract.

Värnamo 
On January 14, 2023, Bustos officially joined Swedish club Värnamo on a free transfer, signing a two-year contract with the club.

International career

Youth
Bustos has represented Canada at youth level and was a part of the Canadian team at the 2013 FIFA U-17 World Cup. He courted controversy in July 2014 when he accepted a call-up from the Chile U-20 squad for a training camp prior to an invitational tournament in the United States. This prompted a negative reaction from Canadian soccer media circles. Bustos would state in an interview that he was not spurning Canada, and simply "keeping his options open." He was cut from the final Chile squad, however. Bustos was subsequently left off the Canadian U-20 team that went to 2014 Milk Cup the following month, but returned to the team for a series of friendlies in November, where he scored a goal for Canada against Russia's U-21 side. In January 2015 Bustos made the Canadian team for the 2015 CONCACAF U-20 Championship.

Senior
Bustos received his first call up to the Canadian senior team for a friendly against Ghana on October 2, 2015. Bustos made his debut for the senior side on October 13 as a substitute, replacing fellow debutante Charlie Trafford.

Honours

Club
Pacific FC
Canadian Premier League: 2021

Personal life
Marco Bustos has a Chilean father and an Italian mother.

Career statistics

References

External links

1996 births
Living people
Association football midfielders
Canadian soccer players
Soccer players from Winnipeg
Canadian people of Chilean descent
Sportspeople of Chilean descent
Canadian sportspeople of Italian descent
Canadian expatriate soccer players
Expatriate footballers in Mexico
Canadian expatriate sportspeople in Mexico
Expatriate soccer players in the United States
Canadian expatriate sportspeople in the United States
Vancouver Whitecaps FC U-23 players
Vancouver Whitecaps FC players
Whitecaps FC 2 players
Club Atlético Zacatepec players
OKC Energy FC players
Valour FC players
Pacific FC players
USL League Two players
Major League Soccer players
USL Championship players
Ascenso MX players
Canadian Premier League players
Canada men's youth international soccer players
Canada men's international soccer players
2015 CONCACAF U-20 Championship players
Homegrown Players (MLS)